Bitburger Land is a Verbandsgemeinde ("collective municipality") in the district Bitburg-Prüm, in Rhineland-Palatinate, Germany. The seat of the Verbandsgemeinde is in Bitburg, itself not part of the Verbandsgemeinde. It was formed on 1 July 2014 by the merger of the former Verbandsgemeinden Bitburg-Land and Kyllburg.

The Verbandsgemeinde Bitburger Land consists of the following Ortsgemeinden ("local municipalities"):

 Badem 
 Balesfeld 
 Baustert 
 Bettingen 
 Bickendorf 
 Biersdorf am See 
 Birtlingen 
 Brecht 
 Brimingen 
 Burbach 
 Dahlem 
 Dockendorf 
 Dudeldorf 
 Echtershausen 
 Ehlenz 
 Enzen 
 Eßlingen 
 Etteldorf 
 Feilsdorf 
 Fließem 
 Gindorf 
 Gondorf 
 Gransdorf 
 Halsdorf 
 Hamm 
 Heilenbach 
 Hütterscheid 
 Hüttingen an der Kyll 
 Idenheim 
 Idesheim 
 Ingendorf 
 Kyllburg 
 Kyllburgweiler 
 Ließem 
 Malberg 
 Malbergweich 
 Meckel 
 Messerich 
 Metterich 
 Mülbach 
 Nattenheim 
 Neidenbach 
 Neuheilenbach 
 Niederstedem 
 Niederweiler 
 Oberkail 
 Oberstedem 
 Oberweiler 
 Oberweis 
 Olsdorf 
 Orsfeld 
 Pickließem 
 Rittersdorf 
 Röhl 
 Sankt Thomas 
 Scharfbillig 
 Schleid 
 Seffern 
 Sefferweich 
 Seinsfeld 
 Steinborn 
 Stockem 
 Sülm 
 Trimport 
 Usch 
 Wettlingen 
 Wiersdorf 
 Wilsecker 
 Wißmannsdorf 
 Wolsfeld 
 Zendscheid 

Verbandsgemeinde in Rhineland-Palatinate